The Columbus Catfish were a minor league baseball team in Columbus, Georgia.  They were a Class A team in the South Atlantic League, and were an affiliate of the Tampa Bay Rays for the 2007 and 2008 seasons. The Catfish relocated to Bowling Green, Kentucky for the 2009 season and are now known as the Bowling Green Hot Rods.

The Catfish played home games at Golden Park.  The team colors were royal blue, peach, and sand.  The name "Catfish" referred to the fish of the same name, which is commonly eaten in the South and is often harvested from the Chattahoochee River.  The city of Columbus and Golden Park itself lie on the Chattahoochee.  The peach in the Catfish logo indicates that they are from the state of Georgia and not the Columbus Clippers of Columbus, Ohio.

In 2007, the Catfish swept the West Virginia Power in three games to win their first South Atlantic league championship.

History 

The Catfish, then known as the Wilmington Waves as one of two South Atlantic League expansion teams in 2001, played their inaugural season in Wilmington, North Carolina, as an affiliate of the Los Angeles Dodgers.  The team left Wilmington after one season due to the lack of a permanent stadium. The Waves moved to Albany, Georgia, for one season until settling in Columbus, which had lost the RedStixx prior to the 2003 season.  The team was known as the South Georgia Waves during its single season in Albany and its first year in Columbus.

Relocation to Bowling Green
The team was sold to New Hampshire Fisher Cats owner Art Solomon in April 2008. Solomon would move the team to Bowling Green, Kentucky, for the 2009 season, where the team would be known as the Bowling Green Hot Rods.

Season-by-season records

|-
| 2001 || 75 || 63 || 2nd ||
|-
| 2002 || 75|| 63 || 2nd ||
|-
| 2003 || 64 || 72 || 11th ||
|-
| 2004 || 69 || 69 || 7th ||
|-
| 2005 || 57 || 79 || 14th ||
|-
| 2006 || 72 || 68 || 7th ||
|-
| 2007 || 82 || 53 || 2nd 2 || League championsSouthern Division, 2 games to 0 over Augusta. League Finals, 3 games to 0 over West Virginia.
|-
| 2008 || 67 || 69 || 10th ||
|-

2001: Wilmington Waves 
2002: South Georgia Waves, Albany 
2003: South Georgia Waves, Columbus 
1- 1st half Southern division champions
2- 2nd half Southern division champions

Notable events 
May 20, 2004: Catfish pitcher Chuck Tiffany pitched a 7-inning perfect game against the Greensboro Bats in game 2 of a doubleheader. Tommy Lasorda, Tiffany's boyhood idol, saw the performance.
June 10, 2004: Catfish pitcher Julio Pimentel set all-time Columbus records, outdueling Rome Braves (and future Atlanta Braves) pitcher Chuck James by striking out the first 8 batters, and 16 total in game 1 (7 innings complete game) of doubleheader.
September 13, 2007: Catfish defeat West Virginia Power 6–0 in game 3 to clinch their first South Atlantic league championship in a three-game sweep.

References

External links
Bowling Green Professional Baseball

Defunct South Atlantic League teams
Sports in Columbus, Georgia
Los Angeles Dodgers minor league affiliates
Tampa Bay Rays minor league affiliates
2003 establishments in Georgia (U.S. state)
2008 disestablishments in Georgia (U.S. state)
Professional baseball teams in Georgia (U.S. state)
Baseball teams established in 2003
Baseball teams disestablished in 2008
Defunct baseball teams in Georgia